List of pre-twentieth century structures by height

See also
History of the world's tallest buildings
List of tallest buildings and structures

References

 Ancient structures
Tallest ancient structures
History of construction